The Millard E. Tydings Memorial Bridge carries Interstate 95 (I-95) over the Susquehanna River between Cecil County and Harford County, Maryland. The toll bridge carries 29 million vehicles annually. It is upstream from the Thomas J. Hatem Memorial Bridge, which carries the parallel U.S. Route 40 (US 40).

The bridge is named for Millard Tydings (1890–1961), a longtime political figure in Maryland who served as U.S. Senator from 1927 to 1951. It was built between January 1962 and November 1963 between bluffs high above the river valley, and is posted with warning signs "Subject to Crosswinds."   It was dedicated, along with the highway it carries, by U.S. president John F. Kennedy on November 14, eight days before he was assassinated in Dallas, Texas. The next year, the highway was renamed the John F. Kennedy Memorial Highway.

It is one of eight toll facilities operated by the Maryland Transportation Authority. The toll, levied on northbound traffic only, is $8.00 for two-axle vehicles as of July 1, 2013; larger vehicles pay another $8 per additional axle. In March 2020, the remaining toll collectors were replaced with electronic tolling because of the COVID-19 pandemic, with tolls payable through E-ZPass or Video Tolling, which uses automatic license plate recognition. All-electronic tolling was made permanent in August 2020.

The bridge was closed during Hurricane Sandy on October 30, 2012, perhaps the first time it was ever shut down.

See also
 
 
 
 List of crossings of the Susquehanna River

References

External links

Millard E. Tydings Memorial Bridge on Google Street View

Bridges completed in 1963
Bridges over the Susquehanna River
Buildings and structures in Havre de Grace, Maryland
Toll bridges in Maryland
Monuments and memorials in Maryland
Tolled sections of Interstate Highways
Road bridges in Maryland
Interstate 95
Bridges on the Interstate Highway System
Bridges in Cecil County, Maryland
Bridges in Harford County, Maryland
Steel bridges in the United States